Neath Canadian Skies is a 1946 American Northern film about Mounties.

It was directed by B. Reeves Eason from a story by James Oliver Curwood. Filming took place in June 1946 through Golden Gate Pictures, in a studio that used to be a ping pong parlor.

The same team also made North of the Border (1946).

Cast
 Russell Hayden as Tim Ransom, also known as Joe Reed
 Inez Cooper as Linda Elliot
 Douglas Fowley as Ned Thompson
 Cliff Nazarro as Wilbur Higgins
 I. Stanford Jolley as Bill Haley
 Jack Mulhall as Captain Sharon
 Kermit Maynard as Stony Carter

References

External links
 
 
 

Royal Canadian Mounted Police in fiction
1946 films
American Western (genre) films
1946 Western (genre) films
1940s English-language films
Lippert Pictures films
Films directed by B. Reeves Eason
American black-and-white films
Northern (genre) films
Films based on works by James Oliver Curwood
1940s American films